The Staff Specialist Corps is a combat service support branch of the United States Army. Currently it is used only by the United States Army Reserve and United States National Guard for unassigned officers. It was formerly the Staff and Administrative Reserve Section of the reserve forces.

Chaplains Candidate
The only exception to the Staff Specialist Corps branch insignia is the Chaplain Candidate. Chaplain Candidates wear a similar insignia consisting of an open book, two laurel branches crossed at the stems with a shepherd’s crook. Chaplain Candidates were transitioned from the Staff Specialist Branch to the Chaplain Branch which left the candidates without an authorized branch insignia. The Chief of Chaplains submitted a request for collar insignia which was approved by HQDA, G-1 on 23 February 2012. The design for the collar insignia was authorized on 18 June 2012.

External links
Staff Specialist Corps

Footnotes

Branches of the United States Army